Sir John Mason (1503 – 20 April 1566) was an English diplomat and spy.

Origins and education 

Mason was born to humble parents in Abingdon in Berkshire (now Oxfordshire) in 1503. His father is said to have been a cowherd, his mother was the sister of a monk at Abingdon Abbey; possibly Thomas Rowland, the last abbot. Alternatively, there are rumours that Mason was, in fact, the abbot's illegitimate son.

Whatever his family connection to the boy, Rowland played an important role in his education, sending him to the abbey school, followed by All Souls College, Oxford, where he became a Fellow in 1521, got his B.A. on 8 July 1521, and his M.A. on 21 February 1525. He was also ordained as an acolyte in 1521.

At Oxford he attracted the attention of Sir Thomas More, who prevailed upon Henry VIII to appoint him King's scholar in Paris, with an annual allowance of £3 6s 8d, which was doubled in 1531. His income was further boosted by the addition of the first of many ecclesiastical benefices: the rectory of Kingston Bagpuize in Berkshire.

Career 
He was appointed Clerk of the Parliaments in July 1550, succeeding William Paget, 1st Baron Paget (to whom he had been deputy since January 1542), although it seems the two shared the office from December 1551.

He became Chancellor of the University of Oxford for the periods 1552–1556 and 1559–1564.

He was Member of parliament for Reading (UK Parliament constituency) in 1547, and for Hampshire (UK Parliament constituency) on four occasions between 1554 and 1563.

He worked for several Tudor monarchs collecting information from the Continent and as a diplomat. He was knighted by Edward VI and made Dean of Winchester.

John Mason School, a secondary school in Abingdon, is named after him.

See also
 List of Old Abingdonians

References

External links 

 

 
 

1503 births
1566 deaths
16th-century English diplomats
English spies
16th-century English Anglican priests
16th-century English Roman Catholic priests
Fellows of All Souls College, Oxford
Knights Bachelor
People educated at Abingdon School
Chancellors of the University of Oxford
People from Abingdon-on-Thames
16th-century spies
Deans of Winchester
Members of the Privy Council of England
Clerks of the Privy Council
Clerks of the Parliaments